Menorca Airport, also known as Mahón Menorca Airport is an international airport serving the island of Menorca, one of Spain's Balearic Islands in the Mediterranean Sea. The airport is primarily used by charter and seasonal flights and is busiest during the April-October season. In 2019, the airport handled over 3 million passengers, making it the fifteenth busiest airport in the country that year.

History

The first airfield on Menorca (San Luis Aerodrome) was constructed in the late 1930s during the Spanish Civil War, with an 850 metre runway. During the 1940s, the airfield was often used by planes coming from the neighbouring island of Mallorca and in 1949, Spain's Ministry of Aviation agreed to make San Luis a fully civilian airfield. In August 1949, the airfield's first inaugural flight landed from Barcelona, operated by Aviaco and using a Bristol 170 aircraft. During the late 1950s and early 60s, the runway was extended twice in order to accommodate the larger Douglas DC-4, which Aviaco had begun flying to San Luis. In September 1965, the airfield was officially renamed as Mahón Airport.

By the 1960s, with the increase in passenger traffic, came the demand for a new and larger airport to be built, with a longer runway to accommodate larger aircraft. In 1967, construction began on what is now the site of the current airport and, on 24 March 1969, the new airport known as Menorca Airport was officially opened. Since then, San Luis has primarily been used by light aircraft as a flying club.

Throughout the 1970s and 80s, passenger traffic continued to grow and, by 1986, the airport's passenger numbers had exceeded 1 million per year. This then prompted the construction of the airport's current terminal in 1987, which opened to the public in May 1988. Due to the continual rise in passenger numbers, the airport was further expanded and refurbished several times during the 1990s and 2000s, opening in its current form in 2008.

Terminal
Menorca Airport currently has 42 check-in desks, 16 departure gates (5 with airbridges) and 6 baggage claim carousels. 

On 14 September 2006 a partial roof collapse occurred in the new part of the terminal undergoing construction work. The collapse may have been caused by a build-up of heavy rain water. The debris temporarily trapped 20 and injured 3 workers.

In 2016, for the first time, the annual passenger volume processed through the airport exceeded 3 million.

Airlines and destinations

Passenger

Cargo

Statistics

Ground Transportation

Public Transport
Menorca airport is served by bus route 10 linking it with the Mahón central bus station. Services run Monday to Sunday from approximately 0600 to 2245 in both directions, with the exact timetable and frequencies varying over the months of the year to essentially reflect tourism-related demand; the trip duration is 10 minutes. The service is operated by Torres Allés Autocares on behalf of local authorities.

References

External links

Airports in the Balearic Islands
Airport
Airports established in 1969